Dawsonville is an unincorporated community in Restigouche County, New Brunswick, Canada.

The population from the U.S. census of 2010 was 22,330.

History

Notable people

See also
List of communities in New Brunswick

References
 

Communities in Restigouche County, New Brunswick